Events in the year 1867 in Paraguay.

Incumbents
President: Francisco Solano López
Vice President: Domingo Francisco Sánchez

Events
October 21 - Battle of Tatayibá
October 28 - Battle of Potrero Obella
November 3 - Second Battle of Tuyutí

Births

Deaths
February 7 - José E. Díaz

References